The Belgian Historical Institute in Rome, founded 1902, is a scholarly research institute focused on the study of Roman, and more broadly Italian, history and antiquities. It is currently located in the Academia Belgica and is one of a number of Roman Historical Institutes.

Foundation
The idea for the foundation of a Belgian historical institute in Rome for the identification and publishing of Italian sources relating to Belgian history came from the ecclesiastical historian Alfred Cauchie, professor at the Catholic University of Leuven. He published a pamphlet to this effect in 1896.

The institute was founded in 1902, in the Palazzo Rusticucci-Accoramboni, with Ursmer Berlière as its first director.

Publications
The institute has a strong focus on the publication of historical sources, primarily in the series Analecta Vaticano-Belgica.

The institute's Bulletin ceased publication in 2010 and has been replaced by a digital journal, Forum Romanum Belgicum.

Directors
The directors of the institute have been the following:
1902–1906: Ursmer Berlière
1906-1916: Godefroid Kurth
1916-1918: Charles Moeller
1918-1922: Alfred Cauchie
1922-1930: Ursmer Berlière
1930-1935: Henri Pirenne
1935-1947: Joseph Cuvelier
1947-1955: Camille Tihon
1955-1972: Charles Terlinden
1972-1986: Léon-Ernest Halkin
1986-2001: Ludo Milis
2001-2009: Michel Dumoulin
2009-: Jan De Maeyer

References

External links

Organisations based in Rome
Research institutes established in 1901
Historical research institutes